John Alexander Westlake (born July 1970) is a British–Czech Hi Fi designer.

Early life and education
John Westlake is a son of a Czech mother and a British father. He was born in London but spent his early years in Czechoslovakia. His father was a physicist at the Imperial College in London. He is a self taught Hi Fi designer who didn't receive a formal university education and learnt electronics by observing his father's work.

Career
John Westlake started his Hi Fi career in his early twenties while working for a Hi Fi company Pink Triangle. He designed the Pink Triangle DaCapo digital to analog converter in 1991. He then moved on to working for Cambridge Audio, designing many of their award winning products - Cambridge Audio DACMagic digital to analog converter, CD4, CD4SE, CD6, DAC 123, ISO Magic etc.

He has also been working with semiconductor companies that patent some of his technologies: UK patent on Feedback controller for PWM amplifier, International patent on a signal processing circuit. John Westlake is known for his work on Class D amplifier technology.

In 2008, after years of research and working for semiconductor companies, he started his own company - Lakewest Audio & returned to designing Hi Fi products. He is the designer behind the Peachtree Audio Nova D/A integrated amplifier that was voted a Budget Product of the Year 2009 by Stereophile magazine. Peachtree Audio Decco2 integrated amplifier & the Peachtree Audio iDAC – Tube Hybrid Integrated Amp with "Pure Digital" iPod Dock - voted Stereophile's Products of 2011. His designs also include the Audiolab 8200 CD player – an award winning  Best Product of the Year 2010 and Best Product of the Year 2011 by What HiFi Sound & Vision magazine.

This was followed by the Audiolab 8200CDQ – an all in one CD player, DAC and pre-amplifier. His most successful addition to the  Audiolab product line was the original M-DAC, a standalone D/A converter. M-DAC held What HiFi Sound & Vision magazine award for 4 years consecutive years and became a European Imaging and Sound Association (EISA) European Product of the Year 2012-2013.

His latest cooperation involved Pro-Ject PreBox S2 Digital - DAC/Headphone amplifier, European Imaging and Sound Association (EISA) European Product of the Year 2017-2018, Pro-Ject DAC Box S2+ and Pro-Ject StreamBox S2 Ultra.

He is currently semi-retired.

Patents 
 UK Patent 65135GB on "Feedback Controller for PWM Amplifier"
 United States of America Patent 7046080 on "A Signal Processing Circuit"

Designs

References

1970 births
Living people
British people of Czech descent
British electrical engineers